Maksimilijan "Maks" Mihelčič (Serbian spelling - Максимилијан Михелчић; 29 July 1905 – 25 March 1958) was a Slovenian football goalkeeper who represented the national team of the Kingdom of Yugoslavia at the 1928 Summer Olympics.

He began to play in the Ljubljana ŽŠK Hermes, and is celebrated on the goal HŠK Građanski Zagreb in whose jersey has won state championships 1926 and 1928. As keeper of the Civil, succeeded in the club and the team celebrated Dragutin "Karlek" Friedrich, and with Vrđuka, was the third major Yugoslav national team goalkeeper to 1930. That year he skipped the first World Cup in Uruguay due to political issues. When in 1934 he left Građanski, defended the goal Spartak club in Zagreb appointees Power Station. Like other Slovenian footballer after Stanko Tavčar, he was a member of the Yugoslav national team, and was part of Yugoslavia's team at the 1928 Summer Olympics, but he did not play in any matches. He played 18 games for the national team of Yugoslavia: the first one on 28 October 1925 against Czechoslovakia and the last one on 4 October 1931 against Bulgaria at the Balkan Cup. Mihelčič was a driver by profession, and after World War II was as a youth coach for Dinamo Zagreb.

References

1905 births
1958 deaths
Yugoslav footballers
Slovenian footballers
HŠK Građanski Zagreb players
Footballers at the 1928 Summer Olympics
Yugoslavia international footballers
Olympic footballers of Yugoslavia
Footballers from Ljubljana
Yugoslav First League players
NK Ljubljana players
Association football goalkeepers